is a highly affluent district of Minato, Tokyo. The district today is made up of 5 chome. As of November 1, 2007, the population of Shirokanedai is 10,001.

The former neighborhood of Shirokanedai (Shirokanedaimachi, 白金台町) consisted only of very narrow area along Meguro-dori (Tokyo Prefectural Route 312) and the former imperial estate called Shirokane Goryochi. It was merged with nearby neighborhoods after the promulgation of the current addressing system in 1969.

Overview
Located at the southwestern end of Minato, the neighborhood of Shirokanedai lies between Ebisu, Kamiōsaki and Higashigotanda on the west, Takanawa on the east, and  Shirokane on the north. Shopping amenities and apartment buildings are densely spread along Meguro-dori, Gaien Nishi-dori and Sakurada-dori; however, most in Shirokanedai are quiet residential areas. Shirokanedai remains abundant in natural green space, for historically Shirokanedai-cho was home to the former imperial estate called Shirokane Goryochi (now the Institute for Nature Study and the Tokyo Metropolitan Teien Art Museum are located) and several national institutions such as the former Institute of Public Health and the former Institute of Infectious Diseases (now the Institute of Medical Science, University of Tokyo). Later, Shirokanedai came to be considered one of the most upmarket residential areas in Tokyo, and women resident there — stereotypically wealthy, idle and fashion-conscious — are jocularly referred to as shiroganeeze (シロガネーゼ), an imitation of Milanese for residents of Milan. The restaurants in this street are very popular for wedding ceremonies.

Places

Shirokanedai 1-chōme
Meiji Gakuin University
Meiji Gakuin Senior High School
Kakurin-ji Temple (Seishōkō)
Sheraton Miyako Hotel Tokyo
HAPPO-EN (A wedding venue, former residence of Fusanosuke Kuhara)

Shirokanedai 2-chōme
Hatakeyama Memorial Museum of Fine Art
Takanawadai Station
Shoei Girls' Junior and Senior High School

Shirokanedai 3-chōme
Zuishō-ji Temple

Shirokanedai 4-chōme
 Embassy of the State of Eritrea in Japan
The Institute of Medical Science, The University of Tokyo
Shirokanedai Station

Shirokanedai 5-chōme
 Taipei Economic and Cultural Representative Office in Japan
 Embassy of the Republic of Zimbabwe in Japan
The Institute for Nature Study, National Museum of Nature and Science	
Tokyo Metropolitan Teien Art Museum
Matsuoka Museum of Art

Education

Minato City Board of Education operates public elementary and junior high schools.

Shirokanedai 1-3 chōme, 4-chōme 1-5 and 7-19-ban, and 5-chōme 13-25-ban are zoned to Shirokane Elementary School (白金小学校) and Takamatsu Junior High School (高松中学校). Shirokanedai 4-chōme 6-20-ban and 5-chōme 1-12-ban are zoned to Shirogane-no-oka Gakuen (白金の丘学園) for elementary and junior high school.

The Shoei Girls' Junior and Senior High School, a private girls' school, is in Shirokanedai.

References

Districts of Minato, Tokyo